The 1988–89 Magyar Kupa (English: Hungarian Cup) was the 49th season of Hungary's annual knock-out cup football competition.

Quarter-finals
Games were played on April 19 and May 3, 1989.

|}

Semi-finals
Games were played on May 10 and May 17, 1989.

|}

Final

See also
 1988–89 Nemzeti Bajnokság I

References

External links
 Official site 
 soccerway.com

1988–89 in Hungarian football
1988–89 domestic association football cups
1988-89